Chenar-e Dom Chehr Qoralivand (also Romanized as Chenār-e Dom Chehr Qorʿalīvand; also known as Chenār-e Dom Chehr, Chenār Dom Chehr, Chenār-e Domcheh, Dom Chehr, Dūmchehr, and Qor‘alīvand) is a village in Rural District, in the Central District of Kuhdasht County, Lorestan Province, Iran. At the 2006 census, its population was 2,230, in 440 families.

References 

Towns and villages in Kuhdasht County